Face to Face (1952) is an anthology film adapted from the stories "The Secret Sharer" by Joseph Conrad and "The Bride Comes to Yellow Sky" by Stephen Crane. The film was produced by A&P heir Huntington Hartford and released by RKO Radio Pictures.

"The Secret Sharer"
This segment was directed by John Brahm and adapted by Æneas MacKenzie. It stars James Mason and Gene Lockhart.

"The Bride Comes to Yellow Sky"
This segment was directed by Bretaigne Windust and adapted by James Agee. It stars Robert Preston, Marjorie Steele and Minor Watson.

References

External links
 

1952 films
1952 Western (genre) films
American anthology films
American black-and-white films
American Western (genre) films
Films based on short fiction
Films based on works by Joseph Conrad
Films directed by Bretaigne Windust
Films directed by John Brahm
RKO Pictures films
Films with screenplays by James Agee
1952 drama films
1950s English-language films
1950s American films